The Cyril Connell Challenge is an under-16 competition administered by the Queensland Rugby League. First run in 2021, the competition replaced the QRL Junior State Championships, which ran from 2017 to 2020. The 2020 competition was ultimately cancelled in the wake of the COVID pandemic. Originally known as The Cyril Connell Cup the competition, which began in 2009, included the junior representative teams of Queensland Cup clubs. The competition also featured teams from Victoria and the Northern Territory. In the 2016 season, the Cyril Connell Cup consisted of sixteen clubs: fifteen based within in Queensland and one in Victoria. Eleven of the sixteen clubs were junior representative teams for Queensland Cup clubs. From 2011 to 2016, the winners of the Grand Final played the winners of the New South Wales’ under-16 competition, the Harold Matthews Cup, in the National Final.

The Cyril Connell Cup/Challenge was named after Cyril Connell Jr., who played 24 games for Queensland and 2 Tests for Australia between 1952 and 1957.

Teams
In 2021 The Cyril Connell Challenge comprised 15 teams from across the state split into 3 pools. Thirteen of the fifteen clubs were junior representative teams for Queensland Cup clubs. Tweed Heads Seagulls and Redcliffe Dolphins finished equal top of the ladder after going undefeated during their campaigns.

Clubs

Grand Final results

See also

Rugby League Competitions in Australia

References

External links

Rugby league competitions in Queensland
Recurring sporting events established in 2009
2009 establishments in Australia
Sports leagues established in 2009
Junior rugby league
2017 disestablishments in Australia